East Beaver Bay is an unincorporated community in Beaver Bay Township, Lake County, Minnesota, United States.

The community is located between Beaver Bay and Silver Bay on Minnesota Highway 61, on the North Shore of Lake Superior.

East Beaver Bay is located 26 miles northeast of the city of Two Harbors.

References

Unincorporated communities in Minnesota
Unincorporated communities in Lake County, Minnesota